General Karel Řehka (born 1 February 1975 in Tišnov) is a Czech military leader who is the current Chief of the General Staff of the Military of the Czech Republic. Between 2010 and 2014, he was the commander of the 601st Special Forces Group. After leaving the army, he was the director of the National Cyber and Information Security Agency (NÚKIB) from March 2020 to June 2022.

Biography
Between 1989 and 1993 he graduated from the Military Gymnasium in Opava, then between 1993 and 1997 he studied reconnaissance at the Ground Forces College in Vyškov. Before graduating, he completed a one-year officer course at the Royal Military Academy in Sandhurst in the United Kingdom in 1996 as a foreign cadet.

After completing his studies in Vyškov, he was assigned to Prostějov's 6th Special Brigade as a group commander. In 1998, he was sent to the RANGER course in the United States, which he successfully completed in March 1999. In June 1999, he was sent to the Joint Guardian operation in the territory of the Yugoslav province of Kosovo with the 6th KFOR reconnaissance company as the commander of the reconnaissance detachment.

After returning home, in summer of 2000, he was sent to the Military University of the Ground Forces in Vyškov, where he worked as a senior officer in the department of foreign relations (at the same time, he completed his master's degree remotely).

In 2001, together with the inspector of flight instructors, he was entrusted with the task of creating a group of flight instructors at the 32nd base of the tactical air force in Náměšť nad Oslavou. He commanded this group from 2001 to 2002. Subsequently, he returned to Prostějov, where he served from October 2002 as company commander, later as the commander of center of 601st Special Forces Group. He served in this position until July 2006. In the meantime he completed a course on crisis management of state defense at the Military Academy in Brno in 2003. In 2004 he participated as deputy commander of a special forces contingent in Operation Enduring Freedom in Afghanistan.

From August 2006 to July 2009, he served as a Senior Senior Officer - Specialist of the Special Forces Department at the NATO Rapid Reaction Force Headquarters in Rheindahlen, Germany (as such, he returned to Afghanistan twice at the turn of 2006/2007 and 2007/2008). After returning to the Czech Republic, he worked at the Directorate of Special Forces Management of the Ministry of Defense of the Czech Republic and was entrusted with the tasks of military assistant to the Minister of Defense.

From May 2010 to October 2014, he was the commander of the 601st Special Forces Group, during his engagement in 2011 he commanded the Special Forces Task Force in the ISAF operation in Afghanistan. From November 2014 to July 2017, he held the post of director at the newly established Directorate of Special Forces of the Ministry of Defense of the Czech Republic. Subsequently, he performed the newly established position of deputy commander of the Multinational Division Northeast in Elbląg, which includes the alliance's rapid reaction units advanced to the territory of Poland and the Baltics. In 2016, the President of the Czech Republic, Miloš Zeman, appointed him a general.

Karel Řehka is married and has two children. In May 2019, he received the Arnošt Lustig Award for Courage, Bravery, Humanity and Justice for 2018.

References

External links
 Chief of the General Staff of Armed Forces of the Czech Republic

Living people
Czech generals
1975 births
People from Tišnov
Chiefs of the General Staff (Czech Republic)
Czech military personnel of the War in Afghanistan (2001–2021)